Propofol, marketed as Diprivan, among other names, is a short-acting medication that results in a decreased level of consciousness and a lack of memory for events. Its uses include the induction and maintenance of general anesthesia, sedation for mechanically ventilated adults, and procedural sedation. It is also used for status epilepticus if other medications have not worked. It is given by injection into a vein, and the maximum effect takes about two minutes to occur and typically lasts five to ten minutes. Propofol is also used for medical assistance in dying in Canada.

The medication appears to be safe for use during pregnancy but has not been well studied for use in this case. It is not recommended for use during a cesarean section. It is not a pain medication, so opioids such as morphine may also be used; however, whether or not they are always needed is not clear. Propofol is believed to work at least partly via a receptor for GABA.

Propofol was discovered in 1977 and approved for use in the United States in 1989. It is on the World Health Organization's List of Essential Medicines. It is available as a generic medication. It has been referred to as milk of amnesia (a play on "milk of magnesia"), because of the milk-like appearance of the intravenous preparation, and because of its tendency to suppress memory recall. Propofol is also used in veterinary medicine for anesthesia.

Medical uses

Anesthesia
To induce general anesthesia, propofol is the drug used almost exclusively, having largely replaced sodium thiopental. It can also be administered as part of an anesthesia maintenance technique called total intravenous anesthesia, using either manually programmed infusion pumps or computer-controlled infusion pumps in a process called target controlled infusion (TCI). Propofol is also used to sedate individuals who are receiving mechanical ventilation but not undergoing surgery, such as patients in the intensive care unit. In critically ill patients, propofol is superior to lorazepam both in effectiveness and overall cost. Propofol is relatively inexpensive compared to medications of similar use due to shorter ICU stay length. One of the reasons propofol is thought to be more effective (although it has a longer half-life than lorazepam) is because studies have found that benzodiazepines like midazolam and lorazepam tend to accumulate in critically ill patients, prolonging sedation. Propofol has also been suggested as a sleep aid in critically ill adults in the ICU; however, the effectiveness of this medicine at replicating the mental and physical aspects of sleep for people in the ICU is not clear.

Propofol can be run through a peripheral IV or central line. Propofol is frequently paired with fentanyl (for pain relief) in intubated and sedated people. The two drugs are compatible in IV form.

Propofol is also used for deepening of anesthesia in order to relieve laryngospasm. It may be used alone or followed by succinylcholine. Its use can avoid the need for paralysis and in some instances the potential side-effects of succinylcholine.

Procedural sedation
Propofol is safe and effective for gastrointestinal endoscopy procedures. Its use in these settings results in a faster recovery compared to midazolam. It can also be combined with opioids or benzodiazepines. Because of its rapid induction and recovery time, propofol is also widely used for sedation of infants and children undergoing MRI. It is also often used in combination with ketamine with minimal side effects.

COVID-19

In March 2021, the U.S. Food and Drug Administration (FDA) issued an emergency use authorization (EUA) for Propofol‐Lipuro 1% to maintain sedation via continuous infusion in people older than sixteen with suspected or confirmed COVID-19 who require mechanical ventilation in an intensive care unit ICU setting. In the circumstances of this public health emergency, it would not be feasible to require healthcare providers to seek to limit Fresenius Propoven 2% Emulsion or Propofol-Lipuro 1% only to be used for patients with suspected or confirmed COVID-19; therefore, this authorization does not limit use to such patients.

Other uses

Status epilepticus
Status epilepticus may be defined as seizure activity lasting beyond 5 min needing anticonvulsant medication. Several guidelines recommend the use of propofol in the arsenal of drugs that may be used for the treatment of refractory status epilepticus.

Assisted death in Canada
A lethal dose of propofol is used for medical assistance in dying in Canada to quickly induce deep coma and death, but rocuronium is always given—even when patient dies as a result of propofol injection. Delivery order of IV medication is as follows:

Step 1: Midazolam 10–20 mg given as 2−4ml of 5 mg/ml preparation for pre-anesthesia, induces sleep in 1−2 minutes.

Step 2: Lidocaine 40 mg given as 4ml of 1% preparation to reduce the burning sensation and pain associated with the injection of propofol. Pause to allow effect.

Step 3: Propofol 1000 mg given as 100ml of 10 mg/ml preparation. Loss of consciousness occurs within 10 seconds and coma occurs in 1–2 minutes. Death may result from the propofol but rocuronium is still given.

Step 4: Rocuronium 200 mg given as 20ml of 10 mg/ml preparation to induce respiratory arrest. Cardiac arrest subsequently follows about five minutes later due to hypoxia.

Executions
The US state of Missouri added propofol to its execution protocol in April 2012. However, Governor Jay Nixon halted the first execution by the administration of a lethal dose of propofol in October 2013 following threats from the European Union to limit the drug's export if it were used for that purpose.  The United Kingdom had already banned the export of medicines or veterinary medicines containing propofol to the United States.

Recreational use
Recreational use of the drug via self-administration has been reported but is relatively rare due to its potency and the level of monitoring required for safe critically, a steep dose-response curve makes recreational use of propofol very dangerous, and deaths from self-administration continue to be reported.  The short-term effects sought via recreational use include mild euphoria, hallucinations, and disinhibition.

Recreational use of the drug has been described among medical staff, such as anesthetists who have access to the drug. It is reportedly more common among anesthetists on rotations with short rest periods, as usage generally produces a well-rested feeling. Long-term use has been reported to result in addiction.

Attention to the risks of off-label use of propofol increased in August 2009 due to the Los Angeles County coroner's conclusion that music icon Michael Jackson died from a mixture of propofol and the benzodiazepine drugs lorazepam, midazolam, and diazepam on 25 June 2009. According to a 22 July 2009 search warrant affidavit unsealed by the district court of Harris County, Texas, Jackson's physician, Conrad Murray, administered 25 milligrams of propofol diluted with lidocaine shortly before Jackson's death. Even so, as of 2016, propofol was not on a US Drug Enforcement Administration schedule.

Side effects
One of propofol's most common side effects is pain on injection, especially in smaller veins. This pain arises from activation of the pain receptor, TRPA1, found on sensory nerves and can be mitigated by pretreatment with lidocaine. Less pain is experienced when infused at a slower rate in a large vein (antecubital fossa). Patients show considerable variability in their response to propofol, at times showing profound sedation with small doses[1].

Additional side effects include low blood pressure related to vasodilation, transient apnea following induction doses, and cerebrovascular effects. Propofol has more pronounced hemodynamic effects relative to many intravenous anesthetic agents. Reports of blood pressure drops of 30% or more are thought to be at least partially due to inhibition of sympathetic nerve activity. This effect is related to the dose and rate of propofol administration. It may also be potentiated by opioid analgesics.

Propofol can also cause decreased systemic vascular resistance, myocardial blood flow, and oxygen consumption, possibly through direct vasodilation. There are also reports that it may cause green discolouration of the urine.

Although propofol is widely used in the adult ICU setting, the side effects associated with medication seem to be more concerning in children. In the 1990s, multiple reported deaths of children in ICUs associated with propofol sedation prompted the FDA to issue a warning.

As a respiratory depressant, propofol frequently produces apnea. The persistence of apnea can depend on factors such as premedication, dose administered, and rate of administration, and may sometimes persist for longer than 60 seconds.  Possibly as the result of depression of the central inspiratory drive, propofol may produce significant decreases in respiratory rate, minute volume, tidal volume, mean inspiratory flow rate, and functional residual capacity.

Propofol administration also results in decreased cerebral blood flow, cerebral metabolic oxygen consumption, and intracranial pressure.  In addition, propofol may decrease intraocular pressure by as much as 50% in patients with normal intraocular pressure.

A more serious but rare side effect is dystonia. Mild myoclonic movements are common, as with other intravenous hypnotic agents. Propofol appears to be safe for use in porphyria, and has not been known to trigger malignant hyperpyrexia.

Propofol is also reported to induce priapism in some individuals, and has been observed to suppress REM sleep stage and to worsen the poor sleep quality in some patients.

Rare side effects include:

 Anxiety.
 changes in vision.
 cloudy urine.
 coughing up blood.
 delirium or hallucinations.
 difficult urination.
 difficulty swallowing.
 dry eyes, mouth, nose, or throat.
As with any other general anesthetic agent, propofol should be administered only where appropriately trained staff and facilities for monitoring are available, as well as proper airway management, a supply of supplemental oxygen, artificial ventilation, and cardiovascular resuscitation.

Because of its lipid base, some hospital facilities require the IV tubing (of continuous propofol infusions) to be changed after 12 hours. This is a preventive measure against microbial growth and infection.

Propofol infusion syndrome

A rare, but serious, side effect is propofol infusion syndrome. This potentially lethal metabolic derangement has been reported in critically ill patients after a prolonged infusion of high-dose propofol, sometimes in combination with catecholamines and/or corticosteroids.

Interactions 

The respiratory effects of propofol are increased if given with other respiratory depressants, including benzodiazepines.

Pharmacology

Pharmacodynamics
Propofol has been proposed as having several mechanisms of action, both through potentiation of GABAA receptor activity and therefore acting as a GABAA receptor positive allosteric modulator, thereby slowing the channel-closing time. At high doses, propofol may be able to activate GABAA receptors in the absence of GABA, behaving as a GABAA receptor agonist as well. Propofol analogs have been shown to also act as sodium channel blockers. Some research has also suggested that the endocannabinoid system may contribute significantly to propofol's anesthetic action and to its unique properties, as endocannabinoids also play an important role in the physiologic control of sleep, pain processing and emesis. An EEG study on patients undergoing general anesthesia with propofol found that it causes a prominent reduction in the brain's information integration capacity.

Propofol is an inhibitor of the endoccannabinoid Anandamide (AEA: C22H37NO2; 20:4,n-6) metabolizing enzyme Fatty acid amide hydrolase (FAAH), as propofol activation of the endocannabinoid system, possibly via inhibition of AEA catabolism, generate a significant increase in the whole-brain content of AEA, that contributes to the sedative properties of propofol via CB1 receptor activation, and may explain the reason of the side effects of general anesthetics such as psychomimetic and antiemetic properties of propofol and the high incidence of postoperative nausea and vomiting after volatile anesthetics, as they contribute to the opposite and a significant decrease in the whole-brain content of AEA, lasting until 40 min after induction.

Pharmacokinetics

Propofol is highly protein-bound in vivo and is metabolised by conjugation in the liver.
The half-life of elimination of propofol has been estimated to be between 2 and 24 hours. However, its duration of clinical effect is much shorter, because propofol is rapidly distributed into peripheral tissues. When used for IV sedation, a single dose of propofol typically wears off within minutes. Propofol is versatile; the drug can be given for short or prolonged sedation, as well as for general anesthesia. Its use is not associated with nausea as is often seen with opioid medications. These characteristics of rapid onset and recovery along with its amnestic effects have led to its widespread use for sedation and anesthesia.

History
John B. Glen, a veterinarian and researcher at Imperial Chemical Industries (ICI) spent 13 years developing propofol, an effort which led to the awarding to him of the prestigious 2018 Lasker Award for clinical research. Propofol was originally developed as ICI 35868.  It was chosen for development after extensive evaluation and structure–activity relationship studies of the anesthetic potencies and pharmacokinetic profiles of a series of ortho-alkylated phenols.

First identified as a drug candidate in 1973, clinical trials followed in 1977, using a form solubilised in cremophor EL. However, due to anaphylactic reactions to cremophor, this formulation was withdrawn from the market and subsequently reformulated as an emulsion of a soya oil/propofol mixture in water. The emulsified formulation was relaunched in 1986 by ICI (whose pharmaceutical division later became a constituent of AstraZeneca) under the brand name Diprivan.  The currently available preparation is 1% propofol, 10% soybean oil, and 1.2% purified egg phospholipid as an emulsifier, with 2.25%  glycerol as a tonicity-adjusting agent, and sodium hydroxide to adjust the pH. Diprivan contains EDTA, a common chelation agent, that also acts alone (bacteriostatically against some bacteria) and synergistically with some other antimicrobial agents. Newer generic formulations contain sodium metabisulfite or benzyl alcohol as antimicrobial agents. Propofol emulsion is a highly opaque white fluid due to the scattering of light from the tiny (about 150-nm) oil droplets it contains: Tyndall Effect.

Developments 
A water-soluble prodrug form, fospropofol, has been developed and tested with positive results. Fospropofol is rapidly broken down by the enzyme alkaline phosphatase to form propofol. Marketed as Lusedra, this formulation may not produce the pain at injection site that often occurs with the conventional form of the drug. The U.S. Food and Drug Administration (FDA) approved the product in 2008.
However fospropofol is a Schedule IV controlled substance with the DEA ACSCN of 2138 in the United States unlike propofol.

By incorporation of an azobenzene unit, a photoswitchable version of propofol (AP2) was developed in 2012 that allows for optical control of GABAA receptors with light. In 2013, a propofol binding site on mammalian GABAA receptors has been identified by photolabeling using a diazirine derivative. Additionally, it was shown that the hyaluronan polymer present in the synovia can be protected from free-radical depolymerization by propofol.

References

External links 

 
 

AstraZeneca brands
Chemical substances for emergency medicine
General anesthetics
GABAA receptor positive allosteric modulators
GABAA receptor agonists
Glycine receptor agonists
Alkylphenols
World Health Organization essential medicines
Wikipedia medicine articles ready to translate
Isopropyl compounds